Rejuvenation is an album by keyboardist Lonnie Liston Smith, featuring performances recorded and released by the Flying Dutchman label in 1985.

Reception

In his review for AllMusic, Scott Yanow stated "None of the leader's six originals are all that memorable, and the moody performances are actually most successful as superior background music".

Track listing
All compositions by Lonnie Liston Smith except where noted
 "Rejuvenation" − 8:34
 "Island in the Sun" − 6:05
 "London Interlude" − 5:36
 "The Eternal Quest (In Search of Truth)" (Lonnie Liston Smith, Sri Chinmoy) − 5:19
 "A Frozen Lake" − 4:56
 "Girl in My Dreams" − 5:40

Personnel
Lonnie Liston Smith − Fender Rhodes electric piano, acoustic piano
Premik − soprano saxophone (tracks 1, 2, 4 & 6)
Daniel Carillo − guitar
Robert Zantay − lyricon (tracks 1, 3 & 6)
Cecil McBee − bass (tracks 1-4 & 6)
Steve Thornton − percussion (tracks 1-4 & 6)

References

1985 albums
Doctor Jazz Records albums
Lonnie Liston Smith albums
Albums produced by Bob Thiele